The 1911 Ohio Northern football team represented Ohio Northern University during the 1911 college football season.

Schedule

References

Ohio Northern
Ohio Northern Polar Bears football seasons
Ohio Northern football